This is a list of highest passenger railways in operation in Europe. It only includes non-cable railways whose culminating point is over 1,200 metres above sea level. Most of them are located in the Alps, where two railways, the Jungfrau and Gornergrat railways, exceed 3,000 metres and nine other exceed 2,000 metres, including four railway crossings. The Pyrenees, which come second in height, include several railways above 1,500 metres. 

In the Alps, the tree line and the permanent snow line lie respectively at about 2,000 and 3,000 metres. Because of the harsh weather conditions that prevail at those higher altitudes, maintaining working railways there is an expensive and difficult task. Snow, avalanches, rockslides and wind, added to the absence of protection by the forests, pose a challenge in every season. Lower elevation railways (even well below the tree line) are also exposed to more severe weather conditions in winter. Many of the high-elevation railway lines rely on heavy protection infrastructure with some of them built partially underground, notably the Jungfrau and Zugspitze railways.

This list includes both railways carrying primarily tourists and railways connecting actual localities. The former are typically the highest and the steepest, while the latter are generally longer lines with larger gauges. Railways that are both adhesion and standard gauge or wider, therefore part of the main European/Iberian rail network, are boldfaced in the list. Countries where the line is below 1,200 metres are indicated in small letters. For a list focusing on the highest railway stations, see list of highest railway stations in Europe.

List

See also
List of highest paved roads in Europe
Rail transport in Europe
List of mountain railways in Switzerland
List of highest railways in the world
Extreme points of Europe

References
Swisstopo topographic maps
IGN topographic maps

Mountain railways
Rail transport in Europe
Railways